The Cowboy Dave Band is a honky-tonk group, currently based along the Front Range of Colorado. The country quintet was originally formed in 2009 in Omaha, Nebraska, by Cowboy Dave Wilson, who also served as the long-time front man for the cowpunk group FortyTwenty.

Origins 
Wilson spent the better part of seven years (2002–2009) touring through much of the midwest and south with Nebraska-based FortyTwenty, which saw an album reach the No. 12 spot on XM Satellite Radio's X-Country chart and earned an invitation to Nashville, Tenn., by CMT to record songs as part of its "New Voices, No Cover" segment. When the band took an extended hiatus in 2009, Wilson "called in some favors" and recruited players to record a six-song album, "Saddle Up, Pal," which was released on Slackjaw Records on March 30, 2009.

Upon relocating to Colorado Springs, Colorado, in 2010, Wilson assembled a group of Rocky Mountain veteran musicians, including former members of the Railbenders, Slim Cessna's Auto Club, and the Honky Tonk Hangovers.

The Colorado-based group hit Silo Sound Studios  in Denver to record the band's second six-song record, "Driven Man," which was released on February 25, 2014. The album reached No. 149 on the AMA Chart.

The current touring lineup includes Scott Johnson (upright bass), Zach Boddicker (electric guitar), Andy Sweetser (drums) and Christie Schneider (fiddle).

Driven Man (2014) 
Recorded at Silo Sound Studios  by Todd Divel, and produced by Emmy-nominated producer Greg Kincheloe, the sophomore Cowboy Dave EP, "Driven Man," features Denver veterans Glenn Taylor (pedal steel), Scott Johnson (upright bass and vocals), Adam Stern (electric and acoustic guitars) and Andy Walters (drums), as well as additional Nebraskans Sam Packard (fiddle) and Tony Robertson (electric guitar).

Track list 

 Dive of Dives (Wilson)
 Ragged but Right (traditional)
 Driven Man (Wilson)
 Honky-Tonk Me (Wilson)
 Maggie's Mom (Wilson)
 What a Shame (Johnson/Toner/Leonard)

Saddle Up, Pal (2009) 
Produced by Emmy-nominated producer Greg Kincheloe, the debut Cowboy Dave Band EP, "Saddle Up, Pal," features Steve "Fuzzy" Blazek (pedal steel guitar), Tony Hillhouse (drums), Charlie Johnson (upright bass), Tony Robertson (electric guitar), as well as Wilson on fiddle and acoustic guitar.

Track list 
 Friend in a Bottle (Wilson)
 Bill, Wyoming (Wilson)
 Cowboy Dave Theme Song (Wilson)
 Baptist Church Blues (Wilson/Sparks)
 Drug Around (Wilson)
 Dimestore Cowboy (Wilson)

Discography

References 

Musical groups from Denver
Country music groups from Colorado